This article lists events relating to rail transport that occurred during the 1730s.

1737

Births

September births
 September 19 – Charles Carroll of Carrollton, signer of the Declaration of Independence and a co-founder of the Baltimore and Ohio Railroad (died 1832).

See also
Years in rail transport